Pythagoraea is a genus of moths of the family Crambidae. It contains only one species, Pythagoraea categorica, which is found on the Society Islands.

References

Natural History Museum Lepidoptera genus database

Acentropinae
Taxa named by Edward Meyrick
Monotypic moth genera
Moths of Oceania
Crambidae genera